Elections to Lisburn Borough Council were held on 18 May 1977 on the same day as the other Northern Irish local government elections. The election used five district electoral areas to elect a total of 23 councillors.

Election results

Note: "Votes" are the first preference votes.

Districts summary

|- class="unsortable" align="centre"
!rowspan=2 align="left"|Ward
! % 
!Cllrs
! % 
!Cllrs
! % 
!Cllrs
! %
!Cllrs
! % 
!Cllrs
! % 
!Cllrs
! %
!Cllrs
!rowspan=2|TotalCllrs
|- class="unsortable" align="center"
!colspan=2 bgcolor="" | UUP
!colspan=2 bgcolor="" | DUP
!colspan=2 bgcolor="" | Alliance
!colspan=2 bgcolor="" | SDLP
!colspan=2 bgcolor="" | UPNI
!colspan=2 bgcolor="" | UUUP
!colspan=2 bgcolor="white"| Others
|-
|align="left"|Area A
|bgcolor="40BFF5"|50.4
|bgcolor="40BFF5"|2
|20.1
|1
|7.0
|0
|19.9
|1
|0.0
|0
|3.1
|0
|0.0
|0
|4
|-
|align="left"|Area B
|bgcolor="40BFF5"|46.3
|bgcolor="40BFF5"|3
|34.4
|2
|15.1
|0
|0.0
|0
|0.0
|0
|4.2
|0
|0.0
|0
|5
|-
|align="left"|Area C
|24.7
|2
|bgcolor="#D46A4C"|31.0
|bgcolor="#D46A4C"|1
|22.5
|1
|0.0
|0
|0.0
|0
|13.5
|1
|8.3
|0
|5
|-
|align="left"|Area D
|20.9
|2
|bgcolor="#D46A4C"|25.8
|bgcolor="#D46A4C"|1
|23.4
|1
|0.0
|0
|21.8
|1
|4.1
|0
|4.0
|0
|5
|-
|align="left"|Area E
|26.2
|1
|21.3
|1
|bgcolor="#F6CB2F"|27.4
|bgcolor="#F6CB2F"|1
|16.1
|1
|0.0
|0
|3.5
|0
|5.5
|0
|4
|-
|- class="unsortable" class="sortbottom" style="background:#C9C9C9"
|align="left"| Total
|30.0
|10
|26.6
|6
|20.4
|3
|6.2
|2
|5.9
|1
|5.6
|1
|4.0
|0
|23
|-
|}

Districts results

Area A

1973: 3 x UUP, 1 x SDLP
1977: 2 x UUP, 1 x DUP, 1 x SDLP
1973-1977 Change: DUP gain from UUP

Area B

1973: 4 x UUP, 1 x DUP
1977: 3 x UUP, 2 x DUP
1973-1977 Change: DUP gain from UUP

Area C

1973: 2 x UUP, 1 x DUP, 1 x Alliance, 1 x Vanguard
1977: 2 x UUP, 1 x DUP, 1 x Alliance, 1 x UUUP
1973-1977 Change: Vanguard joins UUUP

Area D

1973: 3 x UUP, 1 x DUP, 1 x Alliance
1977: 2 x UUP, 1 x DUP, 1 x Alliance, 1 x UPNI
1973-1977 Change: UPNI gain from UUP

Area E

1973: 2 x UUP, 1 x Alliance, 1 x DUP
1977: 1 x Alliance, 1 x UUP, 1 x DUP, 1 x SDLP
1973-1977 Change: SDLP gain from UUP

References

Lisburn City Council elections
Lisburn